The Parti 51 is a political party in the Canadian province of Quebec that was founded in the late 1980s under the leadership of Serge Talon. The party has proposed the separation of Quebec from Canada in order to seek admission to the United States as the 51st state of the American union.  The party had no success in winning any seat in 1989 election to the National Assembly of Quebec, and in the spring of 1990, asked the Direction of Elections of Quebec to dissolve the party because it no longer had enough members to form an executive committee.

In 2016, the party was relaunched by a Saint-Georges-based lawyer, Hans Mercier.
Becoming a state of the United States of America has been the primary purpose and goal of Parti 51 since its inception.

History 
Founded in August 1989, the party was led by Serge Talon throughout its first version.

The movement presented 11 candidates in the general election of 1989 but obtained only 3846 votes, or 0.11% of the province's vote and no deputy in the National Assembly of Quebec. The average percentage of votes obtained by their candidates compared to the eleven constituencies represents only 1.27%. The scores range from 0.66% (Vachon) to 1.98% (Orford). The party mainly targeted English-speaking constituencies, competing with the Unity Party in six constituencies.

In the spring of 1990, the organization requested its dissolution from the Chief Electoral Officer of Quebec (DGEQ), explaining that it no longer had enough members to form an executive council, it was enacted in 1991.

In 2016, Saint-Georges lawyer Hans Mercier re-launched Parti 51, again calling and campaigning for the annexation of Quebec for it to become an American state. By the time of the 2018 election, the party had an estimated 1,100 members.  Mercier told La Presse that the times have changed since the party's previous era, as Quebec sovereigntism has waned in popularity. Mercier argued that Americans would be welcoming of a new Quebec state, and pointed to a survey taken during the administration of George W. Bush that suggested nearly 34% of Quebecers would support joining the United States.
Of the various reasons and advantages argued by the party in favor of joining the United States of America, one prominent aspect has focused on economic grounds, as for instance by the early 2000s the mutual trade volume between Quebec and the US had surpassed that of Quebec and the remaining provinces of Canada combined, greater autonomy and sovereignty over its own affairs as a US state, access to the US common market, as well as national security and defence, as Quebec as a US state would have its own state National Guard and fall under the umbrella and protection afforded by the federal US Armed Forces.

Similar to the example of Quebec's Parti 51, additional secessionist movements and formal political parties have formed across other Canadian provinces likewise seeking statehood via admission into the United States, such as with Alberta separatism with the formation of Alberta 51. In order to appeal to as wide a base of support as possible, Parti 51 asserts it does not hold positions on any other issues aside from the immediate goal of seceding from Canada and acceding as a state to the US.

Election results

1989 election results 
In the 1989 Quebec general election, the only election in which it nominated candidates, the party nominated 11 candidates, who won 3,846 votes, or 0.11% of the popular vote in the province. The party ran mostly in anglophone areas of the province.

See also
List of political parties in Quebec
Politics of Quebec
Quebec sovereignty movement
Unionest Party 
51st state

References

External links

Defunct provincial political parties in Quebec
Political parties disestablished in 1990
Single-issue political parties
Secessionist organizations in Canada
Saint-Georges, Quebec
1989 establishments in Quebec
1990 disestablishments in Quebec
Provincial political parties in Quebec
2016 establishments in Quebec
Political parties established in 1989
Political parties established in 2016
Canada–United States relations